Davon Stephanus Raubenheimer (born 16 July 1984 in Knysna, South Africa) is a former professional rugby union rugby player. His regular playing position is flanker.

Career

During his time in Kimberley, he was called up to the  Super Rugby side and made his debut during the 2010 Super 14 season.

International

Raubenheimer was a member of the South Africa Under 21 side that won the 2005 Under 21 Rugby World Championship in Argentina and also the Emerging Springboks team that won the 2008 IRB Nations Cup in Romania. He did not earn any full international caps on the tour, but he did play in 2 midweek tour matches.

Honours
Western Coastal Region U18 Craven Week - 2002
2003 –  Under 20
2004 –  Under 20
2005 –  Vodacom and Currie Cup
2005 – South Africa Under-21 Under 21 Rugby World Championship
2006 –  Vodacom Cup
2006 – Southern Spears
2007 –  Vodacom and Currie Cup
2008 –  Vodacom and Currie Cup
2008 – Emerging Springboks IRB Nations Cup in Romania
2009 –  Vodacom and Currie Cup
2009 – Highveld XV 2009 British & Irish Lions tour to South Africa
2009 –  2009 end-of-year rugby union tests
2010 –  Vodacom and Currie Cup
2010 –  Super Rugby
2011 –  Vodacom and Currie Cup
2011 –  Super Rugby
2012 –  Vodacom and Currie Cup
2012 –  Super Rugby
2013 –  Vodacom and Currie Cup
2013 –  Super Rugby
2013 –  (loan) Currie Cup

References

1984 births
Living people
People from Knysna
South African rugby union players
South Africa international rugby union players
Cheetahs (rugby union) players
Free State Cheetahs players
Griquas (rugby union) players
SWD Eagles players
Griffons (rugby union) players
People from the Western Cape
Rugby union flankers
Rugby union players from the Western Cape